Astri Aas-Hansen (born 16 December 1970) is a Norwegian politician for the Labour Party.

In 2005, when Stoltenberg's Second Cabinet assumed office, she was appointed as a political adviser in the Ministry of Justice and the Police. She was promoted to State Secretary in February 2007, and remained here until April 2013. She returned to her former job in Advokatfirmaet Elden.

She hails from Lillesand, and graduated from the University of Oslo with the cand.jur. degree in 1999. From 1995 to 2002 she worked as an advisor for the Labour Party; since 2002 she has worked as a lawyer. She has also held lectures at the University of Oslo and Nesna University College.

References

1970 births
Living people
People from Lillesand
University of Oslo alumni
Labour Party (Norway) politicians
Norwegian state secretaries
Norwegian women state secretaries
Norwegian women lawyers
21st-century Norwegian politicians
21st-century Norwegian women politicians
20th-century Norwegian lawyers
21st-century Norwegian lawyers
20th-century women lawyers
21st-century women lawyers
20th-century Norwegian women